Słaboszów  is a village in Miechów County, Lesser Poland Voivodeship, in southern Poland. It is the seat of the gmina (administrative district) called Gmina Słaboszów.

The village has a population of 340.

It is known as the birthplace of Auschwitz survivor and escapee Jerzy Bielecki.

References

Villages in Miechów County
Kielce Governorate
Kielce Voivodeship (1919–1939)